is a former Japanese football player.

Club statistics

References

External links

1985 births
Living people
Kokushikan University alumni
Association football people from Tokyo
Japanese footballers
J1 League players
J2 League players
Tokyo Verdy players
Kataller Toyama players
Association football defenders